Show-Ya Greatest 1985–1990 is a compilation of songs and of the Japanese hard rock band Show-Ya. The collection was released in 1991 in Japan.

Track listing
"One Way Heart" - 4:18
"Fairy" - 3:56
"Mizu no Naka Toubousha" (水の中の逃亡者) - 3:59
"Kodoku no Meiro (Labyrinth)" (孤独の迷路（ラビリンス）) - 4:52
"We'll Still Be Hangin' On" - 4:58
"Keep Me in your Heart" - 2:50
"Genkai Lovers" (限界 Lovers) - 3:59
"What Do You Say?" - 4:32
"Watashi Wa Arashi" (私は嵐) - 4:05
"Sakebi" (叫び) - 4:27
"Gambling" (ギャンブリング) - 4:00
"Chikasuidou no Tsuki" (地下水道の月) - 7:26

References

External links
Show-Ya discography 

Show-Ya albums
1991 greatest hits albums
EMI Records compilation albums
Japanese-language compilation albums